Alison Peasgood (born Alison Patrick, 1 October 1987) is a British paratriathlete. She competed in the women's PT5 class at the 2016 Summer Paralympics and won a silver medal guided by Hazel Smith.

Biography
Patrick was born in 1987 with albinism. She was blind at birth and gained some sight afterwards, but has never had full vision. Moreover, she suffers from nystagmus, which causes eye movement, and her albinism makes her, and particularly her eyes, sensitive to light. Patrick worked as a physiotherapist at Victoria Hospital in Dunfermline until she moved to Loughborough.

Paratriathlon became an Olympic sport at the 2016 Rio Paralympics. Patrick took the silver medal in the PT5 class behind Katie Kelly of Australia. Her guide for the race was Hazel Smith who is a Durham Engineer. They had trained for two years before the Olympics. They started out with a coffee together and went on to going on tandem bike rides together. Smith was already a tri-athlete having been reserve for the team at 2014 Commonwealth games.

Patrick was voted "West Fife's Sports Personality of the Year ".

In March 2017 she competed at the  UCI Para-cycling Track World Championships in Los Angeles. She teamed up  with cyclist Helen Scott and they gained two more medals. Their tandem came third in the 1km time trial and they gained a silver at the tandem sprint behind Thornhill and Hall.

References 

1987 births
Living people
Scottish female swimmers
British female triathletes
Paralympic swimmers of Great Britain
Paratriathletes of Great Britain
Paralympic medalists in paratriathlon
Paralympic silver medalists for Great Britain
Paratriathletes at the 2016 Summer Paralympics
Medalists at the 2016 Summer Paralympics
21st-century British women
Triathletes at the 2022 Commonwealth Games
Commonwealth Games competitors for Scotland
People with albinism
Competitors in athletics with a visual impairment
Scottish female cyclists
Para-cyclists
Scottish triathletes
Sportspeople from Dunfermline